The 2011 San Francisco mayoral election was held on Tuesday, November 8, 2011, to elect the mayor of San Francisco. The incumbent Ed Lee, appointed to fill the vacant mayoral seat, succeeded in his bid to become the first elected Asian-American mayor of a major American city.

Background 
Gavin Newsom, first elected in 2003 and reelected in 2007, was elected Lieutenant Governor of California in 2010 and sworn in on January 10, 2011. Ed Lee was appointed by the San Francisco Board of Supervisors to finish the balance of Newsom's mayoral term and was sworn in on January 11, 2011. Lee initially pledged not to seek election, although an active movement arose to draft him into the race. By the end of July observers were expecting that Lee would agree to run. On August 8, 2011, Lee announced he was running for Mayor of San Francisco.

The mayoral election was run using instant runoff voting, which was adopted by a referendum in 2002. This voting method was first in effect for the 2007 mayoral election, but no transfers of votes were needed in 2007 since incumbent mayor Gavin Newsom received a majority of the first round votes.

Candidates 
There were sixteen candidates running:
 Jeff Adachi, Public Defender of San Francisco
 Michela Alioto-Pier, former member of the San Francisco Board of Supervisors from District 2
 Cesar Ascarrunz, nightclub owner and community service entrepreneur, mayoral candidate in 1979, 1983, 1987, 1991, and 1999
 John Avalos, member of the San Francisco Board of Supervisors from District 11
 Terry Baum, playwright and actress
 David Chiu, President of the San Francisco Board of Supervisors, member of the San Francisco Board of Supervisors from District 3
 Paul Currier
 Bevan Dufty, former member of the San Francisco Board of Supervisors from District 8
 Tony Hall, former member of the San Francisco Board of Supervisors from District 7
 Dennis Herrera, City Attorney of San Francisco
 Emil Lawrence
 Ed Lee, incumbent Mayor of San Francisco
 Wilma Pang, City College of San Francisco professor
 Joanna Rees, venture capitalist
 Phil Ting, Assessor-Recorder of San Francisco
 Leland Yee, California State Senator from California's 8th State Senate district

Debates 
May 5, 2011: The Leo T. McCarthy Center for Public Service and the Common Good at the University of San Francisco partnering with a national non-profit, buildOn, hosted 'San Francisco Mayoral Candidate Forum on Service' featuring selected mayoral candidates. In attendance were Michela Alioto-Pier, John Avalos, David Chiu, Bevan Dufty, Tony Hall, Dennis Herrera, Joanna Rees, Phil Ting, and Leland Yee.
June 16, 2011: Automattic, the developer of WordPress, hosted 'SFOpen 2011', a town-hall forum focused specifically on open government, citizen engagement and leveraging technology to build better government, moderated by tech entrepreneur Mitch Kapor. The candidates in attendance were Michela Alioto-Pier, John Avalos, David Chiu, Bevan Dufty, Tony Hall, Dennis Herrera, Joanna Rees, Phil Ting and Leland Yee.

July 11, 2011: Valencia Corridor Merchants Association and the Hispanic Chamber of Commerce hosted a mayoral candidate debate at Public Works at 161 Erie St. In attendance were John Avalos, David Chiu, Bevan Dufty, Dennis Herrera and Leland Yee.
August 24, 2011: The Raoul Wallenberg Jewish Democratic Club hosted a mayoral candidate debate at the JCC at 3200 California Street. In attendance were Jeff Adachi, Michela Alioto-Pier, John Avalos, David Chiu, Bevan Dufty, Dennis Herrera, Ed Lee, Phil Ting and Leland Yee.
October 5, 2011: The League of Women Voters of San Francisco, in partnership with UCSF, hosted a mayoral candidate debate at the Robertson Auditorium, UCSF Mission Bay at 1675 Owens Street. Cheryl Jennings of ABC-7 was the moderator. In attendance were Jeff Adachi, Michela Alioto-Pier, John Avalos, Terry Joan Baum, David Chiu, Bevan Dufty, Tony Hall, Dennis Herrera, Ed Lee, Joanna Rees, Phil Ting, Leland Yee.

Polling
Note: Results are for first choice only

Results

Results Summary 
The following table shows a summary of the instant runoff for the election. The table shows the round in which the candidate was defeated or elected the winner, the votes for the candidate in that round, and what share those votes were of all votes counting for any candidate in that round. There is also a bar graph showing those votes for each candidate and categorized as either first-round votes or votes that were transferred from another candidate.

Municipal elections in California are officially non-partisan, though most candidates in San Francisco do receive funding and support from various political parties.

Vote counts by round
The following table shows how votes were counted in a series of rounds of instant runoffs. Each voter could mark which candidates were the voter's first, second, and third choice. Each voter had one vote, but could mark three choices for how that vote can be counted. In each round, the vote is counted for the most preferred candidate that has not yet been eliminated. Then one or more candidates with the fewest votes are eliminated. Votes that counted for an eliminated candidate are transferred to the voter's next most preferred candidate that has not yet been eliminated.

Continuing votes are votes that counted for a candidate in that round. Exhausted ballots represent votes that could not be transferred because a less preferred candidate was not marked on the ballot. Voters were allowed to mark only three choices because of voting system limitations. Over votes are votes that could not be counted for a candidate because more than one candidate was marked for a choice that was ready to be counted. Under votes are ballots were left blank or that only marked a choice for a write-in candidate that had not qualified as a write-in candidate.

References

External links 

 San Francisco Department of Elections: November 8, 2011 Municipal Election
 SmartVoter.org: November 8, 2011 Municipal Election

 Campaign websites
 Jeff Adachi
 Michela Alioto-Pier
 John Avalos
 Terry Baum
 David Chiu
 Paul Currier
 Bevan Dufty
 Tony Hall
 Dennis Herrera
 Ed Lee
 Wilma Pang
 Joanna Rees
 Phil Ting
 Leland Yee

2011 California elections
2011
San Francisco
2011 in San Francisco